Balázs Nagy (born July 9, 1998) is a Hungarian-American pair skater who represents Hungary. With his skating partner, Maria Pavlova, he competed in the final segment at the 2022 European Championships and is the 2022 Hungarian national silver medalist.

Competing for the United States with his former skating partner, Kate Finster, he is the 2020 U.S. national junior champion, the 2019 U.S. national junior silver medalist, and the 2019 JGP Poland silver medalist.

Personal life 
Nagy was born on July 9, 1998 in Budapest, Hungary and later emigrated with his parents to the United States. He has three sisters. Nagy is fluent in both Hungarian and English. He moved back to Budapest for several years during his childhood, before returning to the U.S. to finish high school. Nagy holds dual citizenship between Hungary and the United States. He is currently a student at the University of Colorado Colorado Springs, studying exercise science. 

Nagy's hobbies include reptiles and crystal healing. He enjoys watching movies, driving, and dancing and he loves desserts with cinnamon.

Career

Early career 
Nagy began skating under coaches Oleg Efimov and Natalia Efimova, a former Soviet pairs skater and ice dancer, respectively, in Wake Forest, North Carolina. During this time, he also trained as a gymnast at Apex Gymnastics under coaches Todd McLoughlin and Jeremy Waters. He trained primarily in singles skating, representing first the United States, and then Hungary internationally after his family moved back to Budapest. At the suggestion of his coaches, Nagy briefly tried pairs with Krystal Edwards during the 2011–12 season, but the team split due him being "not ready" and his family returning to Hungary.

Nagy briefly quit skating in 2017, before deciding to return and switch to pairs full-time. He tried out with Kate Finster in the fall of 2017, around Thanksgiving, and they officially teamed up in early 2018. The pair relocated from training with her coaches, Jessica Miller and Stephanie Miller, in Northern Kentucky to work full-time with Dalilah Sappenfield and Larry Ibarra in Colorado Springs.

2018–2019 season 
In their first season as a team, Finster/Nagy were assigned to 2018 JGP Czech Republic, where they finished ninth. They then won silver at Midwestern Sectionals. At the 2019 U.S. Championships, Finster/Nagy won the junior silver medal behind Lockley/Prochnow. As a result, they were named to the 2019 World Junior Championships team. At Junior Worlds, they were tenth after the short program and thirteenth in the free skating, to finish eleventh overall. Nagy called the experience "humbling" and motivation for the next season.

2019–2020 season 
Finster/Nagy opened the season with a sixth-place finish at 2019 JGP United States. They then won their first international medal at 2019 JGP Poland, earning the silver medal, behind Panfilova/Rylov of Russia and ahead of Germany's Hocke/Kunkel. Their results qualified them as first alternates to the 2019–20 Junior Grand Prix Final.

Finster/Nagy won the inaugural U.S. Pairs Final to qualify to the 2020 U.S. Championships. They won their first junior pairs title at the 2020 U.S. Championships, ahead of Smirnova/Siianytsia and Deardorff/Johnson. Their result earned them a berth on the 2020 World Junior Championships team. They finished sixth.

2020–2021 season
Finster/Nagy placed ninth at the ISP Points Challenge.

In December, Nagy announced that the pair had split.

2021–2022 season
Nagy formed a new partnership with Russian skater Maria Pavlova to represent his native Hungary. Making their debut at the Budapest Trophy, where they were seventh, they then competed twice on the Challenger series, finishing fifth at the 2021 CS Denis Ten Memorial Challenge and thirteenth at the 2021 CS Golden Spin of Zagreb.

After winning the silver medal at the Hungarian Championships, Pavlova/Nagy made their debut at the European Championships, finishing eleventh.

Programs

With Pavlova

With Finster

Competitive highlights 
CS: Challenger Series; JGP: Junior Grand Prix

With Pavlova for Hungary

With Finster for the United States

Men's singles for Hungary

With Edwards for the United States

Men's singles for the United States

Detailed results

With Finster

Junior results

References

External links 
 
 
 Kate Finster / Balazs Nagy at U.S. Figure Skating

1998 births
Living people
American male pair skaters
Hungarian male single skaters
Hungarian emigrants to the United States
Figure skaters from Budapest